The Canastra Mountains (Serra da Canastra)
are a range of hills in the Minas Gerais state of southeastern Brazil. The headwaters of the São Francisco River begin at this range and it is the location of the Serra da Canastra National Park and the Casca d'Anta waterfall. The altitude ranges from 900 m to 1,496 m. Kimberlite sites in this range have proven to be a rich source of diamonds.

See also 

 Três Pontas Mountains

References

Mountain ranges of Brazil